Ēriks Grigjans (born 25 December 1964) is a retired Latvian football goalkeeper.

References

1964 births
Living people
Soviet footballers
Latvian footballers
FK Liepājas Metalurgs players
Valmieras FK players
FK Rīga players
Association football goalkeepers
Latvia international footballers
Latvian football managers
Latvian expatriate footballers
Expatriate footballers in Estonia
Latvian expatriate sportspeople in Estonia